Stephen Robert Irwin (22 February 19624 September 2006), known as Steve Irwin and "The Crocodile Hunter", was an Australian zookeeper, conservationist, television personality, wildlife educator, and environmentalist.

Irwin grew up around crocodiles and other reptiles and was educated regarding them by his father Bob. He achieved international fame from the television series The Crocodile Hunter (1996–2007), an internationally broadcast wildlife documentary series that he co-hosted with his wife Terri. The couple also hosted the series Croc Files (1999–2001), The Crocodile Hunter Diaries (2002–2006), and New Breed Vets (2005). They had two children, Bindi and Robert.

In 2006, while filming a documentary in Australia's Great Barrier Reef, Irwin died from an injury caused by a stingray. His death became international news and was met with expressions of shock and grief by fans, the media, governments, and non-profit organizations. Numerous parks, zoos, streets, the vessel MY Steve Irwin, the snail species Crikey steveirwini, and the asteroid  have been named in his honour. The Irwin family continues to operate Australia Zoo.

Early life 
Stephen Robert Irwin was born on his mother's 20th birthday to Lyn (Hakainsson) and Bob Irwin in Upper Ferntree Gully, a suburb of Melbourne. His parents were both of English and Irish descent, with some Swedish on his mother's side. He moved with his parents as a child to Queensland in 1970, where he attended Landsborough State School and Caloundra State High School. Irwin described his father as a wildlife expert interested in herpetology, while his mother Lyn was a wildlife rehabilitator. After moving to Queensland, Bob and Lyn Irwin started the small Queensland Reptile and Fauna Park, where Steve grew up around crocodiles and other reptiles.

Irwin became involved with the park in a number of ways, including taking part in daily animal feeding, as well as care and maintenance activities. On his sixth birthday, he was given a  scrub python. He began handling crocodiles at the age of nine after his father had educated him on reptiles from an early age. Also at age nine, he wrestled his first crocodile, again under his father's supervision. He worked as a volunteer for Queensland's East Coast Crocodile Management program and captured over 100 crocodiles, some of which were relocated, while others were housed at the family park. Irwin took over the management of the park in 1991 and renamed it Australia Zoo in 1998.

Career

The Crocodile Hunter and related work 

Steve and his wife Terri spent their honeymoon trapping crocodiles together. Film footage of their honeymoon, taken by John Stainton, became the first episode of The Crocodile Hunter. The series debuted on Australian TV screens in 1996 and made its way onto North American television the following year. The Crocodile Hunter became successful in the United States, the UK, and over 130 other countries, reaching 500 million people. Irwin's exuberant and enthusiastic presenting style, broad Australian accent, signature khaki shorts, and catchphrase 'Crikey!' became known internationally. Sir David Attenborough praised Irwin for introducing many to the natural world, saying 'He taught them how wonderful and exciting it was. He was a born communicator'.

American satellite and cable television channel Animal Planet ended The Crocodile Hunter with a series finale titled 'Steve's Last Adventure'. The last Crocodile Hunter documentary spanned three hours with footage of Irwin's across-the-world adventure in locations including the Himalayas, the Yangtze River, Borneo, and the Kruger National Park.

After The Crocodile Hunter, Irwin went on to star in other Animal Planet documentaries, including Croc Files, The Crocodile Hunter Diaries and New Breed Vets. Animal Planet also created the annual Croc Week marathon, which lasted a full week in the middle of June, every year from 2000 to 2007. During a January 2006 interview on The Tonight Show with Jay Leno, Irwin announced that Discovery Kids would be developing a show for his daughter, Bindi Sue Irwin – a plan realized after his death as the series Bindi the Jungle Girl.

Other television and film work 

In 1998, Irwin continued his television career, working with director Mark Strickson to present The Ten Deadliest Snakes in the World. He appeared on several episodes of The Tonight Show with Jay Leno. A 2000 FedEx commercial with Irwin lightheartedly dealt with the possibility of occupational death from snakebite and the fanciful notion that FedEx would have saved him, if only FedEx were used.

Under Irwin's leadership, the operations grew to include the zoo, the television series, the Steve Irwin Conservation Foundation (later renamed Wildlife Warriors), and the International Crocodile Rescue. Improvements to the Australia Zoo include the Animal Planet Crocoseum, the rainforest aviary and Tiger Temple. Irwin mentioned that he was considering opening an Australia Zoo in Las Vegas, Nevada, and possibly at other sites around the world.

In 2001, Irwin appeared in a cameo role in the Eddie Murphy film Dr. Dolittle 2, in which an alligator warns Dolittle that he knows Irwin is going to grab him and is prepared to attack when he does, but Dolittle fails to warn Irwin in time. Irwin's only starring feature film role was in 2002's The Crocodile Hunter: Collision Course, which was released to mixed reviews. In the film, Irwin (who portrayed himself and performed numerous stunts) mistakes some CIA agents for poachers. He sets out to stop them from capturing a crocodile, which, unknown to him, has actually swallowed a tracking transmitter. The film won the Best Family Feature Film award for a comedy film at the Young Artist Awards. The film was produced on a budget of about US$12 million, and has grossed $33 million. To promote the film, Irwin was featured in an animated short produced by Animax Entertainment for Intermix.

In 2002, Irwin and his family appeared in the Wiggles video/DVD release Wiggly Safari, which was set in Australia Zoo and featured singing and dancing inspired by Australian wildlife. Irwin fronted an advertising campaign for The Ghan in 2003, a passenger train operating between Adelaide, Alice Springs, and Darwin. A Pacific National NR class locomotive was named Steve Irwin as part of the campaign.

Environmentalism 

Irwin was a passionate conservationist and believed in promoting environmentalism by sharing his excitement about the natural world rather than preaching to people. He was concerned with conservation of endangered animals and land clearing leading to loss of habitat. He considered conservation to be the most important part of his work: 'I consider myself a wildlife warrior. My mission is to save the world's endangered species'. Irwin bought 'large tracts of land' in Australia, Vanuatu, Fiji, and the United States, which he described as 'like national parks' and stressed the importance of people realising that they could each make a difference.

Irwin founded the Steve Irwin Conservation Foundation, which became an independent charity and was later renamed 'Wildlife Warriors Worldwide'. He also helped found International Crocodile Rescue, the Lyn Irwin Memorial Fund (named in memory of his mother, who died in an automobile crash in 2000), and the Iron Bark Station Wildlife Rehabilitation Facility.

Irwin urged people to take part in considerate tourism and not support illegal poaching through the purchase of items such as turtle shells or shark-fin soup.

Sir David Attenborough was an inspiration to Irwin, according to his widow. When presenting a Lifetime Achievement Award to Attenborough after Irwin's death at the British National Television Awards on 31 October 2006, Terri Irwin said, 'If there's one person who directly inspired my husband it's the person being honoured tonight.... [Steve's] real, true love was conservation – and the influence of tonight's recipient in preserving the natural world has been immense'. Attenborough reciprocated by praising Irwin for introducing many to the natural world, saying, 'He taught them how wonderful and exciting it was[;] he was a born communicator'.

Sporting activities 
Irwin loved mixed martial arts competitions and trained with Greg Jackson in the fighting/grappling system of Gaidojutsu.

Like many Australians, he was an avid cricket fan. This was seen during his visit to Sri Lanka where he played cricket with some local children and said 'I love cricket' and 'It's a shame we have to go catch some snakes now'. This was seen during the Crocodile Hunter episode 'Island of the Snakes'.

Having grown up in Essendon, Irwin was a fan of the Essendon Bombers, an Australian rules football club in the Australian Football League. Irwin took part in an Australian Rules football promotion in Los Angeles as part of 'Australia Week' in early 2006. After his death, a picture of Irwin wearing a Bombers guernsey was shown by ESPN.com in their Bottom 10 ranking of the worst Division I FBS college football teams after Week 1 of the season in tribute to him.

Having lived in Queensland most of his life, Irwin was also a fan of rugby league. As a teenager, he played for the Caloundra Sharks as a second-rower, and as an adult he was known to be a passionate Brisbane Broncos fan and was involved with the club on several occasions. On one occasion after turning up to training he asked if he could tackle the largest player, Shane Webcke. Despite being thrown to the ground and looking like he'd been crushed he was jovial about the experience.

Irwin also supported rugby union, being a fan of the national team, the Wallabies. He once wore a Wallaby jersey during a demonstration at the zoo. A behind-the-scenes episode of The Crocodile Hunter showed Irwin and the crew finding a petrol station in a remote part of Namibia to watch the Wallabies defeat France in the 1999 Rugby World Cup Final.

Irwin was also a talented surfer.

Media campaigns 
Irwin was involved in several media campaigns. He enthusiastically joined with the Australian Quarantine and Inspection Service to promote Australia's strict quarantine requirements, with advertisements and posters featuring slogans such as, 'Quarantine Matters! Don't muck with it'. His payments for these advertising campaigns were directed into his wildlife fund.

In 2004, Irwin was appointed ambassador for The Ghan, the passenger train running from Adelaide to Alice Springs in the central Australian outback, when the line was extended all the way to Darwin on the northern coast that year. For some time he was sponsored by Toyota.

Irwin was a keen promoter for Australian tourism in general and Queensland tourism in particular. In 2002, the Australia Zoo was voted Queensland's top tourist attraction. His immense popularity in the United States meant he often promoted Australia as a tourist destination there. As a part of the United States' 'Australia Week' celebrations in January 2006, Irwin appeared at UCLA's Pauley Pavilion in Los Angeles, California.

Search and rescue in Mexico 
In November 2003, Irwin was filming a documentary on sea lions off the coast of Baja California Peninsula in Mexico when he heard via his boat's radio that two scuba divers were reported missing in the area. Irwin and his entire crew suspended operations to aid in the search. His team's divers searched with the rescue divers, and Irwin used his vessel to patrol the waters around the island where the incident occurred, as well as using his satellite communications system to call in a rescue plane. On the second day of the search, kayakers found one of the divers, Scott Jones, perched on a narrow rock ledge jutting out from the side of a cliff. Irwin and a crew member escorted him to Irwin's boat. The other lost diver, Katie Vrooman, was found dead by a search plane later the same day not far from Jones' location.

Personal life

Marriage and family 
In 1991, Irwin met Terri Raines, an American naturalist from Eugene, Oregon, who was visiting wildlife rehabilitation facilities in Australia and had decided to visit the zoo. According to the couple, it was love at first sight. Terri said at the time, 'I thought there was no one like this anywhere in the world. He sounded like an environmental Tarzan, a larger-than-life superhero guy'. They were engaged four months later and were married in Eugene on 4 June 1992. Together they had two children: a daughter, Bindi Sue Irwin (born 24 July 1998), and a son, Robert Clarence Irwin (born 1 December 2003). Bindi Sue is jointly named after two of Steve Irwin's favourite animals: Bindi, a saltwater crocodile, and Sui, a Staffordshire Bull Terrier. Robert is named after Irwin's father Bob and Terri's father Clarence.

Irwin once described his daughter Bindi as 'the reason [he] was put on the Earth'. His wife once said, 'The only thing that could ever keep him away from the animals he loves are the people he loves even more'. Although the Irwins were happily married, they did not wear wedding rings; they believed that in their line of work, wearing jewellery could pose a hazard to them or the animals. Irwin frequently said that if he was to be remembered for anything, he hoped that it would be for being a good father.

On 11 February 2000, Irwin's mother Lyn was killed in a car accident. In an online tribute, he called her 'the most beautiful, loving, nurturing, and caring person to have ever blessed this world'.

Death and funeral 

Irwin died on 4 September 2006, after being pierced in the chest by a short-tail stingray barb while filming in the Great Barrier Reef with Philippe Cousteau Jr. The stinger penetrated his thoracic wall, causing massive trauma.  He was at Batt Reef, near Port Douglas, Queensland, taking part in the production of the documentary series Ocean's Deadliest.  Irwin's death is believed to be the only fatality from a stingray captured on video. His death was met with shock and grief by fans, the media, governments and non-profit organisations.

A private funeral service took place on 9 September 2006. Irwin was buried in a private ceremony at Australia Zoo later that same day. A public memorial service was held in Australia Zoo's 5,500-seat Crocoseum on 30 September 2006; this service was broadcast live and it is estimated to have been seen by over 300 million viewers.

Legacy

Posthumous movie and television appearances 
Irwin provided his voice for the 2006 animated film Happy Feet, as an elephant seal named Trev. The film was dedicated to Irwin, as he died during post-production. Another, previously incomplete scene, featuring Irwin providing the voice of an albatross and essentially playing himself, was restored to the DVD release.

In 2007, a special episode of The Crocodile Hunter was made in tribute to him; Crikey! What an Adventure: An Intimate Look at the Life of Steve Irwin. The documentary features archive footage from The Crocodile Hunter. Later that year, Bindi released the documentary My Daddy, the Crocodile Hunter in Irwin's memory. He appears in several episodes of Bindi the Jungle Girl via archive footage. Archive footage of him has also been used in the television series Crikey! It's the Irwins, which began airing in 2018.

Steve Irwin Day 
Steve Irwin Day is an annual event on 15 November, honouring the life and legacy of Irwin. The date was chosen because it takes place on the birthday of one of Irwin's favourite animals, a tortoise from the Galápagos Islands. Events that take place include people raising money for Wildlife Warriors to help continue Irwin's conservation work, and employees at Australia Zoo wearing khaki uniforms in Irwin's memory.

Honours 
In 1997, while on a fishing trip on the coast of Queensland with his father, Irwin discovered a new species of turtle. Later given the honour of naming the newly discovered species, he named it Irwin's turtle (Elseya irwini) after his family. Another newly discovered Australian animal – a species of air-breathing land snail, Crikey steveirwini, was named after Irwin in 2009.

Irwin was awarded the Centenary Medal by the Australian government in 2001 for his 'service to global conservation and to Australian tourism'. In 2004, he was recognised as Tourism Export of the Year. He was also nominated in 2004 for Australian of the Year but it was awarded to Australian cricket captain Steve Waugh, while Irwin was named 2004 Queensland Australian of the Year. Shortly before his death, Irwin was to be named an adjunct professor at the University of Queensland's School of Integrative Biology. On 14 November 2007, Irwin was awarded the adjunct professorship posthumously. In 2007, Irwin was posthumously inducted into the Logie Hall of Fame.

In May 2007, the government of Rwanda announced that it would name a baby gorilla after Irwin as a tribute to his work in wildlife conservation. Also in 2007, the state government of Kerala, India named the Crocodile Rehabilitation and Research Centre at Neyyar Wildlife Sanctuary in his honour; however, Terri objected that this action had been taken without her permission and asked the Kerala government in 2009 to stop using Irwin's name and images – a request with which the state government complied in mid-2009.

Irwin, after his death, was described by Mark Townend, CEO of RSPCA Queensland, as a 'modern-day Noah'. British naturalist David Bellamy lauded his skills as a natural historian and media performer. Canadian environmentalist David Suzuki paid tribute to Irwin, noting that '[h]umanity will not protect that which we fear or do not understand. Steve Irwin helped us understand those things that many people thought were a nuisance at best, a horror at worst. That made him a great educator and conservationist'.

After his death, the vessel  owned by the environmental action group Sea Shepherd Conservation Society was renamed . Shortly before his death, Irwin had been investigating joining Sea Shepherd's 2007–2008 voyage to Antarctica to disrupt Japanese whaling activity. Following his death, the organisation suggested renaming their vessel, and this idea was endorsed by Terri. Regarding the ship and its new name, Terri said, 'If Steve were alive, he'd be aboard with them!'

Irwin was inducted in 2009 into the Queensland Business Leaders Hall of Fame, recognised for international entrepreneurship both in business and wildlife conservation, significantly contributing to Queensland and its international reputation and in 2015, Irwin was a posthumous recipient of the Queensland Greats Awards. In 2017 it was announced that Irwin would be posthumously honoured with a star on the Hollywood Walk of Fame. The star was unveiled on 26 April 2018. On 22 February 2019, the 57th anniversary of Irwin's birth, the search engine Google released a Google Doodle commemorating him, in the form of a slideshow.

Controversies 
On 2 January 2004, Irwin carried his one-month-old son, Robert, in his arm while hand-feeding a chicken carcass to Murray, a  saltwater crocodile. The infant was close to the crocodile, and comparisons were made in the press to Michael Jackson's dangling his son outside a German hotel window. In addition, some child welfare groups, animal rights groups, and some of Irwin's television viewers criticised his actions as irresponsible and tantamount to child abuse. Irwin apologised on the US NBC show Today. Both he and his wife publicly stated that Irwin was in complete control of the situation, as he had dealt with crocodiles since he was a small child, and based on his lifetime of experience neither he nor his son was in any danger. He also showed footage of the event shot from a different angle, demonstrating that they were much farther from the crocodile than they had appeared in the publicised clip. Terri said their child was in no more danger than one being taught to swim. No charges were filed; according to one journalist, Irwin told officials he would not repeat the action. The incident prompted the Queensland Government to change its crocodile-handling laws, banning children and untrained adults from entering crocodile enclosures.

In June 2004, allegations were made that he disturbed wildlife (namely whales, seals and penguins) while filming The Crocodile Hunter episode "Ice Breaker" in Antarctica. The matter was subsequently closed without charges being laid.

After questions arose in 2003 about Irwin being paid $175,000 worth of taxpayers' money to appear in a television advertisement and his possible political ties, Irwin told the Australian Broadcasting Corporation (ABC) that he was a conservationist and did not choose sides in politics. His comments describing Australian Prime Minister John Howard as the 'greatest leader in the world' earned him scorn in the media.

In response to questions of Australia's problems with overgrazing, salinity, and erosion, Irwin responded: "Cows have been on our land for so long that Australia has evolved to handle those big animals". The Sydney Morning Herald concluded with the opinion that his message was confusing and amounted to "eating roos and crocs is bad for tourism, and therefore more cruel than eating other animals".

Filmography

Film

Television

References

External links 

 Profile at Australia Zoo
 
 Ocean Treasures Memorial Library/Steve Irwin Memorial
 
 
 
 Steve Irwin digital story and oral history: Queensland Business Leaders Hall of Fame 2009, State Library of Queensland

 
1962 births
2006 deaths
20th-century Australian zoologists
20th-century naturalists
Accidental deaths in Queensland
Australian conservationists
Australian herpetologists
Australian male voice actors
Australian naturalists
Australian people of English descent
Australian people of Irish descent
Australian people of Swedish descent
Australian television presenters
Burials in Queensland
Deaths due to fish attacks 
Discovery Channel people
Steve
Logie Award winners
People from Queensland
Q150 Icons
Queensland Greats
Zoo owners